The sixth season of the American version of The Mole began airing on Netflix from October 7, 2022, after a fourteen-year hiatus and leaving its former network, ABC. The season was produced by Eureka Productions with a new host, Alex Wagner. The cast was revealed on 21 September 2022, with the season's location confirmed to be Australia.

Format
Following a similar format as several versions of the franchise, twelve players are gathered to complete assignments to earn money for the group pot. However, one of the twelve is the titular "Mole", a player selected by production to secretly sabotage the assignments and cause the group to earn the least amount of money for the winner's pot as possible. Every few days, players would take a multiple choice test about the identity of the Mole and the Mole's actions over the course of last few days. Once the test is complete, the players await their results in an elimination ceremony. The player with the lowest score is eliminated from the game, while in the event of the tie the player who completed their test the slowest is executed. Contestants are eliminated until there are three remaining players (two genuine contestants and the Mole themself), where they must complete a final test about the identity and actions of the Mole throughout the season. Unlike past editions, the question of "Who is The Mole?" had the most weight in terms of the final quiz outcome - had both genuine contestants answered differently, then the winner would be the one to correctly identify the mole. Had they answered the same on this question, then the answers of the other questions would be used to determine the winner.

Contestants

Elimination Chart
The chart reflects the results of each quiz, and not reflective of which episode it took place in.

Key
 Blue indicates the player won the game
 Yellow indicates the player was the Mole
 Light grey indicates the player finished as the runner-up
 White indicates the player was safe
 Green indicates the player won an exemption
 Red indicates the player scored the lowest on the quiz and was eliminated
 Out indicates the player was given a second chance to re-enter the game but failed the mission and remained eliminated

Episodes 

Notes

Season Summary 
Missions are listed in this section in chronological order.

Episode 1

Jungle Mission
All 12 candidates meet at a plane in the Daintree Rainforest for the first mission. They must split into three groups to find and retrieve three cargo crates within the jungle: one suspended from a tree (Avori, Dom, Kesi & William), one buried underground (Joi, Osei, Samara & Sandy) and one submerged in a river (Casey, Greg, Jacob & Pranav). For each crate found and returned to the plane within one hour, and kept there until the following morning, $5,000 would be added to the pot.

Inside the plane are bags of maps and supplies which groups can use to help them locate and retrieve the crates. Each bag also contains a sealed envelope with a clue to help them release the crate, however opening it reduces the crate's value by $2,500. Also hidden inside the plane is a secret mission. If the contestant who finds the mission is able to steal one of the cases unnoticed, the value of the case is doubled. If they are caught, the crate loses all value.

$12,500 was earned for the pot.

Episode 2

 Prison Break Mission
The group must elect the two players as the "masterminds" of the mission (Casey & Dom), who then divide the remaining nine candidates into three groups. Each group member begins locked in a cell within their group's cell block in the Boggo Road Gaol: Cell block D (Greg, Joi & Kesi), Cell block E (Avori, Samara & William) or Cell block F (Jacob, Pranav & Sandy). Similar to an escape room, they must utilize various items and clues to escape their cell, and help remaining members escape if necessary.  If all three groups escape their cell within one hour, $10,000 is added to the pot.

Throughout the mission, the masterminds are given several decisions to make. First, they can reduce the time-limit by ten minutes to raise the potential earnings to $20,000. Second, they can spend $1,000 to give each group a clue to escape. Third, they can spend $5,000 to increase the remaining time-limit by five minutes.

$14,000 was earned for the pot.

 Red Button Mission
Adapted from Season 9 of De Mol, candidates travel in two cars, which form their group for the mission, to a warehouse. Each group enters either Sector 31 (Dom, Jacob, Joi, Kesi, Samara & William) or Sector 45 (Avori, Casey, Greg, Pranav & Sandy) of the warehouse where they learn that one contestant will be eliminated after the upcoming quiz. Each group can press the red button in the room, or leave it. If both groups don’t press the button, $10,000 is earned for the pot. However, if one group presses the button, they receive exemptions for the upcoming quiz and no money is earned for the pot. If both groups press the red button, the first group to do so receive the exemptions.

To press the red buttons, groups must activate them first by deciphering several clues in an adjacent room, using a periodic table, to obtain the password "salvation". Every ten minutes, a phone line between the two sectors is activated and two members from each group must remain on the phone while it is connected.

No money was earned for the pot. Avori, Casey, Greg, Pranav & Sandy pressed the red button first and won exemptions for the next quiz.

Episode 3

 Knowledge Is Power Mission 
Adapted from Season 9 of De Mol, each candidate is individually presented with a dilemma. They can read a set of dossiers containing information about the remaining candidates or leave them unread. If no candidates read the dossiers, the group earn $10,000 for the pot. The dilemma also stated that their integrity would be rewarded if they didn’t read the dossiers.

After the Sunken Treasure Mission, it was revealed that all candidates who did not read the dossiers could privately bid, with money from the pot, to select a candidate they believe did read the dossiers. The candidate who bids the most money wins the chance to select a candidate who they believe read the dossiers. If they are correct, they receive an exemption and the money they bid is removed from the pot.

Joi had the highest bid of $25,000 and correctly guessed that Greg read the dossiers, meaning she won an exemption and $25,000 was removed from the pot.

 Sunken Treasure Mission
The group divides themselves into two teams: a boat team (Casey, Greg, Jacob, Joi & William) and a plane team (Avori, Dom, Pranav, Kesi & Sandy). The plane team must board a seaplane over the Great Barrier Reef and search for a dinghy containing an underwater retrieval system on a beach, then cross the island to deliver it to the boat team. The boat team must search the seafloor for five chests and use the underwater retrieval system to resurface them. For each chest resurfaced within 90 minutes, $2,000 is added to the pot.

$2,000 was earned to the pot.

Episode 4

 Re-Entry Mission
Adapted from Season 4 of De Mol, after Dom’s elimination at the start of the episode, he is driven to Ravenswood after the group, and given a chance to return to the game by guessing the American city printed on the back of the car, from a list of ten cities. To assist, he can use a walkie-talkie to ask the group biographical questions about themselves. If the group chooses to help answer the questions, he can use their answers to eliminate incorrect options. If Dom correctly guesses the city (Seattle), he returns to the game with $10,000 for the pot, otherwise he remains eliminated.

The group ultimately decided to not assist Dom with re-entering the game. No money was earned for the pot, and Dom remained eliminated after guessing incorrectly between Seattle and Melmore.

 Bank Heist Mission
The group must elect their two best "critical thinkers" (Kesi & Pranav) who then divide the remaining seven candidates into two teams: a gold team (Casey, Greg, Joi & William) and a cash team (Avori, Jacob & Sandy). Each critical thinker then coordinates a group for the mission from the surveillance room of a bank. Pranav directed the cash team while Kesi directed the gold team.

The cash team must count exactly US$10,000 of banknotes from a vault. However, the notes are denominated in various foreign currencies and their critical thinker must inform them of the exchange rate of each currency written on a sign to convert the money. If they count the equivalent of US$10,000 exactly at the end of one hour, they would earn $10,000 for the pot.

The gold team must first maneuver past several lasers to reach a vault with over 1,000 lockboxes and three sets of keys. They must match the keys to its lockbox to unlock them and find ten gold nuggets. Their critical thinker can inform them which key unlocks each box by finding its value and name in a logbook. Unbeknownst to them, only the ten lockboxes with a gold-related name e.g. "K. Midas" in the logbook contain gold. If the group find all ten gold nuggets within one hour, $10,000 is added pot.

No money was earned for the pot.

Episode 5

 Mail Run Mission
Candidates divide themselves into three groups based on how they want to travel for the mission: by train (Casey, Greg & Kesi), on foot (Avori, Pranav & William) or by car (Jacob & Joi). Each group has 90 minutes (the time it takes the train) to collect three packages and deliver them to Dagun Station.

The group travelling by train must use a hook to retrieve three packages hanging on the side of the track as the train passes on the way to Dagun Station. Each bag they obtain is worth $2,000. The group travelling on foot must run seven miles down a trail towards Dagun Station, collecting their three packages worth $3,000 each at properties along the way. Along the trail, they also found bicycles which they can use instead at the cost of $2,000. The group travelling by car must use a map to navigate and drive themselves to Dagun Station and collect three packages worth $1,000 each along the way. For each package delivered to Dagun Station in time, its value is added to the pot.

$11,000 was earned for the pot - $7,000 from the foot team and $4,000 from the train team.

 Food Bomb Mission
Adapted from Season 9 of De Mol, each candidate sits on a chair around a table. Once they are seated, it is revealed that two candidates are sitting on the detonator of a bomb, which explodes if both of them stand up.

During the challenge, the group is served a three-course lunch. Each visually identical dish is served as normal for the candidates sitting on the detonator, but has an unusual taste or flavor for the remaining candidates. After each course, they must vote for two candidates to leave the table based on their reaction to consuming the food. If one or two of the candidates sitting on the detonator remain at the end of the third course, the group may earn $15,000. However, candidates remaining at the end of the meal may have a chance to win an exemption instead.

After the three courses, Joi and William remained seated. As the candidate not sitting on the detonator, Joi can walk towards a dilemma. She can defuse the bomb within three minutes to earn $15,000 for the pot, or hold an exemption and let the bomb explode to claim it. She chose to defuse the bomb, winning the $15,000 for the pot.

Episode 6

 Mountaineering Mission
Before the mission, the Mole selected three candidate’s backpacks to place $10,000 in. The group must complete a mountaineering course through the Blue Mountains, which includes abseiling down a cliff face, scaling a rock and pulling themselves across a tightrope. However, along course, including the start, the group must select a total of four candidates not to continue the course. This means they cannot proceed to the finish with their backpack, although they can still communicate with the group via a two-way radio. For each backpack that contains $10,000 to reach the end of the course within two hours, the money inside is added to the pot.

Two backpacks containing money reached the finish meaning $20,000 was earned for the pot.

 Chained Up Mission
Adapted from Season 5 of the American version of The Mole, the group begin chained together in an empty building. Every ten minutes, a cage opens, and one candidate can take the key inside and unlock themselves from the chain each time. If all seven candidates unlock themselves, then $20,000 is added to the pot. However, next to the key is also an exemption; if any player takes the exemption, they claim it for themselves, no money is earned, and any contestants still chained must spend the night in the building.

Kesi was chosen first to approach the cage and took the exemption, claiming it for herself, meaning no money was earned for the pot.

Episode 7

 Fake Painting/Fake Story Mission
Adapted from Season 7 of De Mol, the first part of the challenge presents the group with two paintings: one genuine painting on display at a gallery and one painted by the Mole. Each candidate individually guesses which painting is fake and each candidate who correctly guesses has the chance to win an exemption.

Candidates who correctly guess the fake painting (Avori, Jacob & Joi) are individually taken to three separate locations for the second part of the challenge - adapted from Season 17 of Wie is de Mol?. Two of them undergo unique experiences: walking on hot coals and holding a snake, while the other does nothing and must later lie about it to try and deceive the three candidates who guessed incorrectly.

Afterwards, the three candidates who guessed incorrectly (Greg, Kesi & William) can interrogate each candidate to determine who is lying. If they correctly guess who is lying about their experience, $20,000 is added to the pot; otherwise, the three candidates who correctly guessed the fake painting all win exemptions.

Greg, Kesi & William correctly guessed that Jacob was lying, meaning $20,000 was earned for the pot and the exemptions were not claimed.

Episode 8

 Cage Rescue Mission
Adapted from Season 4 of De Mol, the group must select the candidate they believe is the most observant, Avori, who is taken to and locked in a birdcage hidden somewhere in Sydney. She can use various items in the cage — a cell phone, a pizza box for Bill and Toni's Italian restaurant and a flyer about homing pigeons — to direct the remaining candidates to her location.

The remaining four candidates split into two groups: Joi & Kesi and Jacob & William. Each group is taken by taxi to a different starting point, given a key, and must find and unlock Avori within 90 minutes to earn $10,000 for the pot.

Joi & Kesi begin at the observation deck of Chifley Tower. Avori can indicate to them to find pigeons flying in a circle at a nearby park if she notices a flock of pigeons flying outside her location. At the park, Joi & Kesi must find a pigeon keeper and select one of three homing pigeons for him to release, the same one pictured in the flyer in Avori's birdcage. If they select the correct pigeon, they could follow its tracking chip using their phone to reach Avori.

Jacob & William begin at Bill and Toni's Italian restaurant. Avori can find the restaurant's phone number on the side of the pizza box, place the order for "Jimmy" written on the box, and specify the name as "Jimmy Vascos" (written in the homing pigeon flyer) when asked, to have a pizza sent to her location. Jacob & William could then follow the pizza delivery motorcycle to Avori's location, however along the way several similar motorcycles would cross their path and they must direct their taxi driver to follow the correct one.

No money was earned for the pot.

Episode 9

 Snowy Mountains Mission
The group must divide into two teams: Blue (Joi & Kesi) and Red  (Avori & William). Each team must follow a trail to the summit of a mountain, finding three beacons along the way. At each beacon, teams can use a tracker to find ice blocks with money frozen inside, and load them onto a pulk before proceeding. Each team can collect a total of $10,000 across the three beacons. For each ice block that reaches the summit within two hours, its amount of money is added to the pot.

$16,000 was earned for the pot.

 Money Risk Mission
Adapted from Season 6 of De Mol, the group must collectively agree to assign each player one of four briefcases worth $0, $1,000, $3,000 or $8,000. After the next elimination, the value of the three surviving contestants' briefcases is added to the pot while the value of the eliminated contestant's briefcase is removed. If they cannot agree, then no money is earned for the pot.

Kesi ended up with the $0 briefcase; Avori ended up with the $1,000 briefcase; William ended up with the $3,000 briefcase and Joi ended up with the $8,000 briefcase. After the next quiz, Avori was eliminated, removing her $1,000 briefcase, meaning $11,000 was earned for the pot.

Episode 10

 Spy Mission
Adapted from Season 7 of De Mol, the group has 30 minutes to collect three canisters worth $5,000 at three zones on Bare Island. At the Red Zone, they must use two poles to collect the canister suspended above a pit without dropping it. At the White Zone, one group member must use suction pads to cross a series of pipes to reach the canister without touching the ground. At the Blue Zone, one group member must cross a "minefield" to collect the canister within five seconds and throw it to another group member who must catch it for the canister to count. Throughout the mission, several drones fly around the island, and the mission is failed if the drones detect movement for three seconds.

$5,000 was earned for the pot, bringing the final pot to $101,500.

Notes

Mole activity
The following Mole activity was revealed during the finale or on Netflix’s YouTube and Twitter accounts 

Jungle Mission: Kesi avoided sabotaging the first mission to garner trust from the contestants.

Prison Break Mission: Kesi saw the key needed to escape outside her cell but avoided telling her group until later to stall for time.

Bank Heist Mission: Kesi avoided reading out the gold-related names from the logbook to her team to prevent the respective lockboxes being opened.

Mail Run Mission: In the train group, Kesi deliberately dropped a bag hanging on the side of the tracks while trying to hook it.

Mountaineering Mission: Kesi agreed to stay behind at the start of the mission despite knowing there was $10,000 in her backpack.

Chained Up Mission: Kesi took the exemption to appear as a genuine contestant who wanted it.

Snowy Mountains Mission: Kesi removed ice blocks containing money from her team's pulk throughout the mission with the intention of deceiving the other candidates that the Mole would not sabotage so obviously.

Spy Mission: Kesi deliberately fell while using the suction pads to cross the pipes, consequently losing the $5,000 canister of the White Zone.

Hidden clues
The following clues were revealed on Netflix's Youtube channel.

Jungle Mission: The flag of Colombia and the numbers "0-6 160" were printed on the side of the plane, representing Kesi's undergraduate education at Columbia University, and her height and weight, respectively.

Bank Heist Mission: The whiskey bar which the group convened at after the mission had a bottle of Kentucky bourbon established in 1994 on the shelf, representing Kesi's home state and year of birth.

Food Bomb Mission: The number 42276 was printed on the bomb, the zipcode of Russellville, Kentucky - Kesi's hometown.

Cage Rescue Mission: The number 19941014 was printed on the barcode of the pizza box, representing Kesi's birthdate: October 14, 1994.

References

2022 American television seasons
6
Television shows filmed in Australia
Television shows set in Australia